The 2009–10 FA Vase Final was the 36th final of the Football Association's cup competition for teams at levels 9-11 of the English football league system. The match was contested between Whitley Bay , of the Northern League Division 1 (level 9), and Wroxham , of the Eastern Counties League (level 9).

Match

Details

References

FA Vase Finals
FA Vase Final
FA Vase Final
Fa Vase Final
Events at Wembley Stadium
FA Vase Final 2010